Deh-e Nar or Deh Nar may refer to:
 Deh-e Nar, Kohgiluyeh and Boyer-Ahmad